Give Me My Chance is a 1957 French film co-written and directed by Léonide Moguy. 

It was known as Donnez-moi ma chance.

Cast
Ivan Desny
François Guérin
Michèle Mercier

External links

Film page at Unifrance
Film page at Senscritique
Give Me My Chance at Letterbox DVD

1957 films
Films directed by Léonide Moguy
French drama films
1950s French-language films
1950s French films